Ethical issues of business communication is the way by which individuals or groups of people exchange information between them.From end-to-end the process, effective communicators try as clearly and accurately to pass on their ideas, intentions and, objectives to their receiver. Communication is successful only when both the sender and the receiver understand the same information.Nowadays business world, effective communication skills are necessary due to the highly informational and technological era,Which has made it easier for exchanging of information between the parties.

Despite of the context, communication is all about choice, reflects values, and has consequences. For better communication, understanding the obvious and the subtle issues relating to communication is necessary. Any company that aims to be socially and ethically responsible must make a priority of ethical communication both inside the company and in its interactions with the public. In theory, many consumers prefer to do business with companies they believe are ethical which gives those ethical businesses an advantage in the market.

Overview 
Some of the vital characteristics of ethical communication are discussed below.

Conveying the point without offending the audience:
While communicating with the audience, expressing the desired message to them in a significant manner is of primary importance.Strong conversation skills can make a big difference in the workplace. Knowing how to share an attentive, friendly discussion will give you more confidence and help you build better relationships. As you improve your skills, you’ll become a more thoughtful listener, give sharper responses, and learn how to handle common mistakes. For instance, the employees in a company can be asked to increase their efficiency in a demanding manner whereas managers and executives will feel offended if the same tone is used on them. There are different ways to explain the exact things to them in a much smoother manner.
Maintain a relationship with the audience:
Maintaining the same wavelength with the audience is very important for a communicator to ensure the audiences feel at home. Experienced communicators immediately build a relationship based on trust with the audience as soon as they start speaking.As the audience shares, ask relevant questions to give them further chances to express themselves. Be curious about the audience! For instance, if they’re talking about a tough presentation they just gave, ask how they felt when they finished.
Avoid withholding crucial information:

In the modern era, information is vital for all decision. Hence, it is essential for any organization to be cautious when communicating with titanic. The related information should be absolute, and all crucial information must be passed on appropriately. Purposely withholding crucial information might result in the public conceiving a bad image.
Well organized value system:
In order to ensure that this concept is successfully practiced and understood in an organization, a well-organized value system must be established throughout the organization by the top management.If an organization functions on the base of value systems common to both the top management and the employees, mutual respect between them will be present. A sound and healthy value system can make way for ethical communication.
Accuracy of information is necessary:

Any information that is to be passed on must be true and accurate. Communicating without checking the truth of the information can be highly dangerous for the organization. Identification of the source and testing the information is necessary before communicating it.

Summary 
The work of an organizational communication professional consists in developing communication plans that seek to restore trust, not only in the organization but the leaders and in all the people who work for it, in verbally promoting ethical behaviors and generating spaces of communication that help support institutional values.

In this way, both managers and employees will be "on the same page," employees will feel heard and respected and will treat customers in the same way. Also, this will generate more loyalty on the part of the client and, therefore, more business. In addition, a business that communicates internally with ethics will most likely project that image in the business community, will seek to maintain good relations with the government and its most successful businesses.  Without the distractions and negative effects that can have the legal implications of running a business " ethically debatable," the organization will be able to concentrate its efforts on its employees, its products, and its clients.

References 

Business ethics
Communication theory
Management cybernetics